The 2004 Michigan Wolverines football team represented the University of Michigan during the 2004 NCAA Division I-A football season.  The team's head football coach was Lloyd Carr.  The Wolverines played their home games at Michigan Stadium.  The team finished the season with an overall record 9–3 and a mark of 7–1 in Big Ten Conference play, winning its second consecutive conference title.  They would not win another one until 2021.  Michigan concluded the season with a loss to Texas in the Rose Bowl.

Schedule

Game summaries

Miami (OH)

Source: ESPN

Notre Dame

San Diego State

Iowa

Indiana

Source: ESPN

Minnesota

Source: ESPN

Illinois

Purdue

Michigan State

Northwestern

    
    
    
    
    
    
    
    
    
    

Michael Hart 23 Rush, 151 Yds

Ohio State

Rose Bowl

Statistical achievements
Braylon Edwards surpassed Anthony Carter's 22-year-old career conference record of 37 touchdown receptions by totaling 39, which continues to be the conference record. He tied the NCAA record with three 1000-receiving yard seasons.

Mike Hart was the Big Ten rushing individual statistical champion (151.8 yards per conference games and 121.2 yards per game).  Braylon Edwards was the Big Ten receiving statistical champion for all games with 8.1 receptions per contest, but Purdue's Taylor Stubblefield won the title for conference games. Edwards swept the yardage titles with 110.8 per game and 108.9 per conference game.

Hart set the current school record for single-season 200-yard games (3), surpassing five predecessors with 2 each.  Braylon Edwards set numerous school records: single-season receptions (97), surpassing Marquise Walker's 86 from 2001; single-season receiving yards (1330), surpassing Walker's 1143; career receptions (252), surpassing Walker's 176; career yards (3541) surpassing Anthony Carter's 3076 set in 1982; career touchdown receptions (39), surpassing Carter's 37; consecutive games with a reception (38), surpassing Walker's 32; consecutive 100-yard reception games (4 tying his own record from the prior year), surpassing Desmond Howard, Carter and Marcus Knight who all had 3 in various seasons.  Only consecutive 100-yard games has been surpassed (by Mario Manningham in 2007). Chad Henne tied Elvis Grbac's 1991 single-season record of 25 touchdown passes.

Starting lineup offense

 Wide receiver: Braylon Edwards
 Left tackle: Adam Stenavich, Mike Kolodziej
 Left guard: David Baas, Leo Henige, Rueben Riley
 Center: Mark Bihl, David Baas
 Right guard: Matt Lentz
 Right tackle: Mike Kolodziej, Jake Long
 Tight end: Tim Massaquoi, Tyler Ecker
 Flanker: Jason Avant, Steve Breaston, Germaine Gonzalez
 Quarterback: Chad Henne
 Tailback: David Underwood, Jerome Jackson, Mike Hart
 Fullback: Kevin Dudley

Awards and honors
The individuals in the sections below earned recognition for meritorious performances.

National
All-Americans: David Baas, Braylon Edwards, Marlin Jackson, Ernest Shazor
Academic All-American: Adam Finley (second team)
Fred Biletnikoff Award: Edwards
Paul Warfield Trophy: Edwards
Rimington Trophy: Baas

Conference

Big Ten Football MVP: Braylon Edwards
 All-Conference: David Baas, Braylon Edwards, Mike Hart, Matt Lentz, Adam Stenavich, Tim Massaquoi, Gabe Watson, Marlin Jackson, Ernest Shazor 
Big Ten Offensive Player of the Year: Edwards
Big Ten Offensive Lineman of the Year: Baas
Big Ten Freshman of the Year: Mike Hart

Team
 Captains: David Baas, Marlin Jackson  
 Most Valuable Player: Braylon Edwards 
 Meyer Morton Award: Braylon Edwards 
 John Maulbetsch Award: Jake Long 
 Frederick Matthei Award: Jason Avant 
 Dick Katcher Award: LaMarr Woodley 
 Arthur Robinson Scholarship Award: Adam Finley; Matt Studenski 
 Hugh Rader Jr. Award: David Baas 
 Robert P. Ufer Award: Kevin Dudley 
 Roger Zatkoff Award: Roy Manning

Coaching staff
Head coach: Lloyd Carr
Assistant coaches: Erik Campbell (assistant head coach), Mike DeBord, Ron English, Jim Herrmann, Fred Jackson, Scot Loeffler, Terry Malone, Andy Moeller, Bill Sheridan
Trainer: Paul Schmidt
Managers:   Brandon Greer (senior manager), Jeff Clancy (senior manager), Joe Ament, Kule Bassman Bob Belke Tom Bellen, Adam Borson, Cody Cedja, Noah Goodman Moe Maczko, Darin Ottaviani, Alex Rust, Brad Rosenwasser, Mark Stasik

References

External links
  2004 Football Team – Bentley Historical Library, University of Michigan Athletics History
 2004 Michigan at NCAA.org
 2004 statistics at ESPN.com

Michigan
Michigan Wolverines football seasons
Big Ten Conference football champion seasons
Michigan Wolverines football